Pseudopungtungia tenuicorpus, or the slender shinner is a species of cyprinid fish endemic to the Korean Peninsula.

References

Pseudopungtungia
Fish described in 1980